The VIB Switch laboratory, Katholieke Universiteit Leuven is a department of VIB located at the Katholieke Universiteit Leuven in Leuven, Belgium. The laboratory is headed by Frederic Rousseau and Joost Schymkowitz.

Its research focuses on functional regulation of cellular processes, which are governed by protein conformational switches that have to be actively controlled to ensure cell viability. The laboratory combines in vitro biophysical techniques and computational structural biology methods with advanced cell biological studies.

References
 Fernandez-Escamilla AM, Rousseau F, Schymkowitz J, Serrano L., Nat Biotechnol. 2004 Oct;22(10):1302-6, Prediction of sequence-dependent and mutational effects on the aggregation of peptides and proteins.

Sources
 J. Comijn, P. Raeymaekers, A. Van Gysel, M. Veugelers, Today = Tomorrow : a tribute to life sciences research and innovation : 10 years of VIB, Snoeck, 2006, 
 Switch laboratory (VIB)
 Switch laboratory (Katholieke Universiteit Leuven)

KU Leuven
Research institutes in Belgium
Flanders
Biochemistry research institutes